Tristan Lamasine (born 5 March 1993) is a French, professional tennis player.

Career

2010–2015
From 2010 to 2015, Lamasine played mostly in the ATP Challenger Tour and the ITF Men's Circuit. 

He made his ITF Men's Circuit singles debut (at a tournament in France) in September 2010 and ATP Challenger Tour singles debut (at the 2011 Challenger Banque Nationale de Rimouski) in March 2011.

From 2010 to 2015, Lamasine played in the singles event of only four ATP World Tour events (2011 Metz, 2014 Gstaad, 2014 Vienna and 2015 Marseille) and was eliminated in the singles qualifying rounds of all of them.

He made his ITF Men's Circuit doubles debut (at a tournament in France) in September 2010. In October 2011, he made his debut in the doubles event of an ATP Challenger Tour tournament, at the 2011 Open de Rennes.

Lamasine made his Grand Slam singles and men's doubles debut at the 2014 French Open. He was beaten in the second qualifying round of the men's singles. He and Laurent Lokoli, who had received a wild card for the men's doubles main draw, lost in the men's doubles first round to the 4th-seeded pair of David Marrero and Fernando Verdasco.

In July 2015, Lamasine reached his first career ATP Challenger Tour singles final at the tournament in Tampere. He defeated André Ghem in the final 6–3, 6–2.

2016
Lamasine qualified for the singles main draw of 2016 Wimbledon Championships after winning three qualifying matches. He lost in the first round of the singles main draw to 25th seed Viktor Troicki in straight sets. It was his first career singles match in the main draw of an ATP World Tour or Grand Slam tournament.

Lamasine won two singles qualifying matches to reach the singles main draw of the 2016 Swedish Open, but lost in the first round to another qualifier, Calvin Hemery, in three sets. That was his first career singles match in the main draw of a non-Grand Slam ATP World Tour tournament.

Lamasine won two singles qualifying matches to reach the singles main draw of the 2016 Swiss Open. He went  on to register his first career singles win in the main draw of an ATP World Tour tournament by defeating Radu Albot in straight sets in the first round. He lost his second-round match to third seed Albert Ramos-Viñolas in straight sets. At that tournament, Lamasine made his doubles debut in a non-Grand Slam ATP World Tour tournament by partnering Paul-Henri Mathieu; the unseeded pair lost in the first round of the main draw.

2019
Starting from the first week of 2019, Lamasine played exclusively on the ATP Challenger Tour until the ATP Tour 250 Lyon Open that was held in late May. At the Lyon Open, Lamasine gained entry to the singles main draw as a lucky loser when Mikhail Kukushkin withdrew due to right shoulder pain. Lamasine had lost to Jannik Sinner in the final qualifying round but defeated him in main draw first round before losing to top seed Nikoloz Basilashvili in the second round.

ATP Challenger Tour and ITF career finals

Singles: 10 (4–6)

Doubles: 29 (18–11)

Performance timelines

Singles
Current through the 2021 French Open.

DoublesCurrent through the 2019 Wimbledon.''

References

External links
 
 

1993 births
Living people
French male tennis players
French people of Martiniquais descent
Tennis players from Paris
People from Thiais
Sportspeople from Val-de-Marne